Artforum is an international monthly magazine specializing in contemporary art. The magazine is distinguished from other magazines by its unique 10½ x 10½ inch square format, with each cover often devoted to the work of an artist. Notably, the Artforum logo is a bold and condensed iteration of the Akzidenz-Grotesk font, a feat for an American publication to have considering how challenging it was to obtain fonts favored by the Swiss school via local European foundries in the 1960s.

John P. Irwin, Jr named the magazine after the ancient Roman word forum hoping to capture the similarity of the Roman marketplace to the art world's lively engagement with public debate and commercial exchange. The magazine features in-depth articles and reviews of contemporary art, as well as book reviews, columns on cinema and popular culture, personal essays, commissioned artworks and essays, and numerous full-page advertisements from prominent galleries around the world.

History
Artforum was founded in San Francisco in 1962 by John P. Irwin, Jr. Irwin was a salesman for Pisani Printing Company and would make frequent stops to the galleries around Brannan Street and the Financial District for deliveries. Gallerists and artists, like Philip Leider, suggested to Irwin that he should start a local arts publication that catered to the West Coast arts scene since they were tired of reading about the same New York-based artists in Art in America, Arts Magazine, or Art News. Through the backing of Pisani Printing Company, Irwin successfully launched the magazine in a small office off of Howard Street. The first issue featured a cover with a work by the kinetic sculpture by Swiss painter Jean Tinguely suggesting the inchoate and indistinct identity of the fledgling publication. “That center section will contain a lot of divergent and contradictory opinion[s],” reads an editorial note in the first issue.

The next publisher/owner Charles Cowles moved the magazine to Los Angeles in 1965 before finally settling it in New York City in 1967, where it maintains offices today. The move to New York also encompassed a shift in the style of work championed by the magazine, moving away from California style art to late modernism, then the leading style of art in New York City. One of Leider's final essays for the magazine, “How I Spent My Summer Vacation, or, Art and Politics in Nevada, Berkeley, San Francisco and Utah," is a reflective first-person account of a cross-country road trip visiting earthworks, such as Michael Heizer’s Double Negative (1969) and Robert Smithson’s Spiral Jetty (1970). The essay grapples with the relationship between politics and art.

The departure of Philip Leider as editor-in-chief in 1971 and the tenure of John Coplans as the new editor-in-chief roughly coincided with a shift towards more fashionable trends and away from late modernism. A focus on minimal art, conceptual art, body art, land art and performance art provided a platform for artists such as Robert Smithson, Donald Judd, Sol LeWitt and others. In 1980, after opening his own gallery in New York City, Charles Cowles divested himself of the magazine. A sister magazine, Bookforum, was started in 1994.

In 2003, the Columbia-Bard graduate Tim Griffin became the editor-in-chief of the magazine. He sought to bring back a serious-tone and invited academics and cultural theorists who were mostly suspicious of art and the market. The writers were mostly European male theorists like Slavoj Zizek, Giorgio Agamben, Alain Badiou, Toni Negri, and Jacques Rancière.  The magazine shed light on a new emergence of digital neo-appropriation artists such as Wade Guyton, Seth Price, and Kelley Walker and eventually featured a cover by artist Danh Vō.

Michelle Kuo, a PhD candidate at Harvard and respected critic, was announced as the editor-in-chief in 2010 after Tim Griffin resigned to pursue other work. The magazine followed a similar, sober tone of under its new leadership with roundtable discussions, book and exhibition reviews, and lively hyper-academic discourse. In October 2017, publisher Knight Landesman resigned in the wake of allegations of sexual misconduct with nine women including a former employee who filed a lawsuit. Artforum initially backed Landesman, saying the allegations were "unfounded" and suggested that lawsuit was “an attempt to exploit a relationship that she herself worked hard to create and maintain.” The magazine's editor Michelle Kuo resigned at the end of the year in response to the publishers' handling of the allegations. Kuo released a statement in Artnews noting, "We need to make the art world a more equitable, just, and safe place for women at all levels. And that can only be achieved when organizations and communities are bound by shared trust, honesty, and accountability." Artforum staff released a statement condemning the way the publishers had handled the allegations.

A new era of Artforum emerged under the leadership of David Velasco in January 2018. In his first issue, featuring a self-portrait by the born HIV-positive artist Kia LaBeija, Velasco wrote a poignant statement: “The art world is misogynist. Art history is misogynist. Also racist, classist, transphobic, ableist, homophobic. I will not accept this. Intersectional feminism is an ethics near and dear to so many on our staff. Our writers too. This is where we stand. There’s so much to be done. Now, we get to work.” Art critic Jerry Saltz immediately praised the new direction the magazine had taken, noting, "And just like that, an Artforum that needed to disappear was gone." The new editorial direction included writing and photographic essays by Molly Nesbit, philosopher and curator Paul B. Preciado, critic Johanna Fatemen, and artists such as Donald Moffet.

Artist Nan Goldin published a harrowing text and photographic account of her addiction to the prescription pain-relief drug OxyContin in a 2018 piece that prompted the founding of P.A.I.N., a campaign to expose the role of Purdue Pharma and the Sackler family in the opioid epidemic in America. This campaign coincided with Christopher Glazek's breaking report in Esquire and several weeks later Patrick Radden Keefe's report in The New Yorker on the Sacklers' "criminal misbranding." Both journalists reported that the drug that led doctors to believe Oxycontin was less addictive that had been reported. Goldin demanded in her essay that the Sacklers donate half of their fortune to drug rehabilitation clinics and programs. Thessaly La Force of the New York Times Style Magazine wrote of the artist, "It is rare these days to see a lone artist like Goldin — especially one both critically and commercially successful, whose work is in dozens of important museum collections, including the Metropolitan Museum of Art and the Museum of Modern Art — step into the ring as an activist."

In 2019, Hannah Black, Ciarán Finlayson, and Tobi Haslett published an essay in Artforum titled "The Tear Gas Biennial," decrying Warren Kanders, co-chair of the board of the Whitney Museum, and his "toxic philanthropy." Although Kanders had donated an estimated $10 million to the museum, the source of his fortune comes from Safariland LLC, a company that manufactures riot gear, tear gas and other chemical weapons used by police and the military to enforce violent order. Although the Geneva Convention in 1925 outlawed the use of tear gas in all international military conflict, the tear gas fired at peaceful protesters and civilians by the police and military during the George Floyd protests in 2020 as well as on migrants on the US-Mexico border is the same brand of tear gas manufactured by Defense Technology, a subsidy of Safariland. A wave of artists from the Biennial, including Korakrit Arunanondchai, Meriem Bennani, Nicole Eisenman and Nicholas Galanin, demanded immediate removal of their work from the Biennial within hours after the essay was published. After mounting pressure from artists, critics, and gallerists urging the public to boycott the show, Kanders stepped down from his leadership position at the museum. The essay was instrumental in his resignation, and in the museum cutting ties with Kanders' financial endowments that were directly connected to the promotion and use of military weaponry and violence during peaceful social unrest.

In December 2022, Artforum was acquired by Penske Media.

On Artforum
A book by Amy Newman chronicling the early history of the magazine, Challenging Art: Artforum 1962–1974, was published by Soho Press in 2000.
Sarah Thornton's documentary book Seven Days in the Art World (2008) contains a chapter titled "The Magazine" which is set in the offices of Artforum. In it, Thornton says, "Artforum is to art what Vogue is to fashion and Rolling Stone was to rock and roll. It’s a trade magazine with crossover cachet and an institution with controversial clout."

Notable contributors

Hilton Als
Walter Darby Bannard
Dodie Bellamy
Andrew Berardini
Maurice Berger
Hannah Black
Yve-Alain Bois
Lizzie Borden
Dennis Cooper
Arthur C. Danto
John Elderfield
Manny Farber
Hal Foster
Michael Fried
Christopher Glazek
RoseLee Goldberg
Nan Goldin
Kim Gordon
Clement Greenberg
Tobi Haslett
Dave Hickey
A. M. Homes
Gary Indiana
Donald Judd
Max Kozloff
Rosalind Krauss
Rachel Kushner
Thomas Lawson
Lucy Lippard
Greil Marcus
Annette Michelson
Robert Morris (artist)
Sarah Nicole Prickett
Barbara Rose
Roberta Smith
Robert Smithson
Amy Taubin
Edmund White

Editors-in-chief
David Velasco (January 2018–)
Michelle Kuo (September 2010–December 2017)
Tim Griffin (September 2003–Summer 2010)
Jack Bankowsky (September 1992–Summer 2003)
Ida Panicelli (March 1988–Summer 1992)
Ingrid Sischy (February 1980–February 1988)
Joseph Masheck (March 1977–January 1980)
In February 1977 Nancy Foote operated as the managing editor without a head editor
John Coplans (January 1972–January 1977)
Philip Leider (June 1962–December 1971)
(Philip Leider left the magazine at the end of the Summer 1971 issue, but remained on the masthead until December 1971)

References

Further reading

External links
Artforum website

Contemporary art magazines
Magazines established in 1962
Magazines published in San Francisco
Magazines published in Los Angeles
Magazines published in New York City
Monthly magazines published in the United States
Visual arts magazines published in the United States